James Fouché (born 28 March 1998) is a New Zealand professional racing cyclist, who currently rides for UCI ProTeam . In 2019 Fouche won the combined under-23 and elite New Zealand National Road Race Championships.

Major results

2016
 Oceania Junior Road Championships
1st  Road race
2nd  Time trial
2017
 National Under-23 Road Championships
2nd Road race
2nd Time trial
2018
 National Under-23 Road Championships
1st  Road race
3rd Time trial
 2nd Clássica da Arrábida
 7th Overall Le Triptyque des Monts et Chateaux
1st  Mountains classification
2019
 1st  Road race, National Road Championships
 National Under-23 Road Championships
1st  Road race
1st  Time trial
 1st  Mountains classification, Tour of Antalya
 1st  Mountains classification, Le Triptyque des Monts et Chateaux
 1st  Mountains classification, Volta ao Alentejo
 5th Overall Paris–Arras Tour
 5th Clássica da Arrábida
 6th Kattekoers
2021
 1st  Mountains classification, Tour d'Eure-et-Loir
 1st  Mountains classification, Tour de la Mirabelle
 1st  Mountains classification, Kreiz Breizh Elites
 8th Overall Course Cycliste de Solidarnosc et des Champions Olympiques
 9th Overall Oberösterreich Rundfahrt
2022
 1st  Road race, Oceania Road Championships
 National Road Championships
1st  Road race
4th Time trial
 1st  Overall Ronde de l'Oise
1st Stage 1
2023
 2nd Gravel and Tar Classic

References

External links

1998 births
Living people
New Zealand male cyclists
Cyclists from Christchurch
21st-century New Zealand people